Big CBS Love was an English-language TV channel started as a joint venture between Reliance Broadcast Network and CBS Studios International in March 2011 to focus on young urban viewers. It was shut down in late November 2013.

Programming
 Australia's Next Top Model
 Canada's Next Top Model
 ILS Special Weekend
 Shedding for the Wedding
 Everybody Loves Raymond
 America's Got Talent
 Sex and the City
 New Zealand's Next Top Model
 Elite Model Look
 Love Flicks
 Rules of Engagement
 I Love Style
 Excused
 Ringer
 Under the Dome
 Dexter

See also
 Big CBS Spark
 Big CBS Prime

References

External links
Official Site

Women's interest channels
CBS Television Network
Television channels and stations established in 2011
2011 establishments in Maharashtra
Television channels and stations disestablished in 2013
2013 disestablishments in India
Former CBS Corporation subsidiaries